This list of the prehistoric life of Nevada contains the various prehistoric life-forms whose fossilized remains have been reported from within the US state of Nevada.

Precambrian
The Paleobiology Database records no known occurrences of Precambrian fossils in Alabama.

Paleozoic

Selected Paleozoic taxa of Nevada

  †Acanthopyge
 †Acmarhachis
 †Acmarhachis typicalis
 †Acodus
 †Acrothyra
 †Acutichiton
 †Adamsoceras
 †Agnostotes clavata – or unidentified comparable form
  †Agnostus
 †Agoniatites
 †Amorphognathus
 †Amphiscapha
 †Ampyx – tentative report
 †Ampyx
 †Anabarella
 † Ananias
 †Anataphrus
  †Anomalocaris
 †Anomphalus
 †Anomphalus jaggerius – type locality for species
 †Apatolichas
 †Archaeocidaris
 †Athyris
 †Athyris lamellosa
 †Atrypa
 †Atrypa parva – or unidentified comparable form
 †Atrypa reticularis
 †Aulopora
 †Aviculopecten
 †Avonia
 †Bactroceras
 †Baltoceras
  †Bathynotus
 †Bathyuriscus
 †Bellerophon
 †Bellerophon needlensis – type locality for species
 †Benthamaspis
 †Biceratops – type locality for genus
 †Biciragnostus
 † Bija
 †Bimuria
 †Bolbocephalus – tentative report
 †Bolbolenellus
 †Bradyfallotaspis
 †Brevibelus
 †Bristolia
 †Brongniartella
 †Brunsia
  †Bumastus
 †Calymene
 †Calyptaulax
 †Camarotoechia
  †Canadaspis
 †Cancelloceras
 †Cancelloceras elegans – or unidentified comparable form
 †Caninia
 †Carinamala
 †Carolinites
 †Catenipora
 †Cavusgnathus
 †Cedaria
 †Ceratocephala – tentative report
 †Ceraurinella
 †Ceraurinus
  †Ceraurus
 †Chancelloria
 †Chancia
 †Chonetes
 †Chonetes logani
 †Cladochonus
 †Cladodus
  †Cleiothyridina
 †Cleiothyridina ciriacksi
 †Cleiothyridina deroissyi
 †Cleiothyridina elegans
 †Cleiothyridina orbicularis
 †Climacograptus
 †Climacograptus innotatus
 †Climacograptus phyllophorus – or unidentified comparable form
 †Cloacaspis
 †Coleoloides
 †Columnaria
  †Composita
 †Composita apheles – or unidentified comparable form
 †Composita mexicana
 †Composita mira
 †Composita ovata
 †Composita parasulcata
 †Composita subquadrata
 †Composita subtilita
 †Composita trinuclea
 †Conchidium
 †Conocardium
  †Constellaria
 †Coosia
 †Cordylodus
 †Cornuodus
 †Cravenoceras
 †Culumbodina
 †Curtoceras
 †Cybelopsis
 †Cymbidium
 †Cypricardinia
 †Cyptendoceras
  †Cyrtospirifer
 †Cyrtospirifer whitneyi
 †Cystodictya
 †Dalmanites
 †Davidsonia
 Dentalium
 †Dicoelosia
 †Dictyonema
  †Didymograptus
 †Dimeropygiella
 †Diplograptus
 †Distomodus
 †Earlandia
 †Echinaria
 †Edmondia
 †Egania – type locality for genus
 †Ehmaniella
 †Elrathina
 †Emmonsia
 †Encrinuroides
  †Encrinurus
 †Eospirifer
 †Epiphyton
 †Esmeraldina
 †Ethmophyllum
 †Euomphalus
 †Fallotaspis
 †Favosites
 †Fenestella
 †Flexicalymene
 †Fremontia
 †Geragnostus
 †Geraldinella
 †Girvanella
 †Glaphurochiton – tentative report
 †Glyptagnostus reticulatus
 †Gnathodus
 †Gogia
  †Goniatites
 †Gracianella
 †Grandinasus
 †Gypospirifer
 †Halysites
  †Helicoprion
 †Heliomera
 †Helminthochiton
 †Hintzeia
 †Holmiella
 †Homagnostus
 †Hunnebergia – tentative report
 †Hyolithellus
 †Hyolithes
  †Hypodicranotus
 †Iapetognathus
 †Icriodus
 †Illaenus
 †Ingria
 †Innitagnostus
 †Irvingella
 †Isograptus
  †Isotelus
 †Jeffersonia
 †Kanoshia
 †Kawina
 †Komaspidella
 †Komia
  †Kootenia
 †Krausella
 †Lachnostoma
 †Ladatheca
 †Lehua
 †Leonardoceras
 †Leonaspis
 †Lingula
  †Lingulella
 †Lonchodomas
 †Lotagnostus
 †Lotagnostus trisectus – or unidentified comparable form
 †Martinia
 †Megalaspidella – tentative report
 †Megalaspides
 †Megistaspis
 †Meristella
 †Meristina
  †Metacoceras
 †Metaplasia
 †Michelinoceras
 †Micromitra
 †Microplasma
 †Modiolus
 †Monograptus
 †Monograptus thomasi
 †Monograptus yukonensis
 †Murchisonia
 †Nardophyllum
  †Naticopsis
 †Naticopsis glomerosa – type locality for species
 †Naticopsis inornata
 †Naticopsis kaibabensis
 †Neospirifer
 †Neospirifer cameratus
 †Neospirifer dunbari
 †Neospirifer goreii
 †Neospirifer latus – or unidentified comparable form
 †Neospirifer triplicatus
 †Nephrolenellus
  †Nevadella
 †Nevadia
 †Niobe
 †Nisusia – tentative report
 †Noblella
 †Nuculoidea
 †Obolella
 †Obolus
 †Ogygopsis
 †Olenellus
 †Olenellus fowleri – type locality for species
 †Olenoides
 †Olenus
 †Opipeuter
 †Orthoceras
 †Oryctocephalus
 †Oryctocephalus indicus
  †Ottoia
 †Oulodus
 †Ovatoryctocara – tentative report
 †Ozarkodina
 †Pachyphyllum
 †Paedeumias
 †Pagetia
 †Paladin
 †Palmettaspis – type locality for genus
 †Parafusulina
 †Paranevadella
 †Paterina
  †Peachella
 †Pelagiella
 †Pentamerus
 †Pentlandia
  †Pentremites
 †Periodon
 †Permocalculus
 †Peronopsis
 †Perspicaris
 †Phacops
 †Phalacroma
 †Phillipsia
 †Phragmophora
 †Phyllograptus
 Pinna
 †Platyceras
 †Platycrinites
 †Platystrophia
  †Pleurocystites
 †Polygnathus
 †Polygnathus angusticostatus
 †Polygnathus angustipennatus – or unidentified comparable form
 †Polygnathus costatus
 †Polygnathus eiflius
 †Polygnathus linguiformis
 †Polygnathus parawebbi
 †Polygnathus pseudofoliatus
 †Posidonia
 †Prodentalium
  †Proetus
 †Profallotaspis – tentative report
 †Protochonetes
 †Protospongia
 †Ptychagnostus
  †Ptychagnostus atavus
 †Punka
 †Quadratia
 †Raymondaspis
 †Rayonnoceras
  †Receptaculites
 †Remopleurides
 †Rensselaeria
 †Repinaella
 †Rhabdiferoceras – type locality for genus
 †Rioceras – tentative report
 †Rossodus – tentative report
 †Sabellidites
 †Sallya
 †Salterella
 †Schwagerina
  †Siphonodendron
 †Skenidioides
 †Sowerbyella
 †Spathognathodus
 †Sphaerocodium
 †Sphaerocoryphe
 †Sphenothallus
  †Spirifer
 †Spirifer centronatus
 †Spirifer opimus
 †Spirifer rockymontanus
 †Spiriferina
 Spirorbis
  †Stigmaria
 †Streptognathodus
 †Streptosolen
 †Stringocephalus
 †Strophomena
 †Stylonema – tentative report
 †Subulites
 †Syringopora
 †Tentaculites
 †Tetragraptus
 †Tetrataxis
 †Thoracocare
  †Triarthrus
 †Trinodus
 †Trocholites
 †Tuzoia
 †Tylonautilus
 †Uraloceras
 †Uraloceras burtiense
 †Uraloceras involutum
 †Uraloceras nevadense – type locality for species
  †Wanneria
 †Watsonella
 †Westergaardites
 †Worthenia
 †Wutinoceras
 Yoldia
 †Youngia – tentative report
 †Zacanthoides

Mesozoic

Selected Mesozoic taxa of Nevada

 †Acrochordiceras – type locality for genus
  †Acrodus
 †Acrodus alexandrae – type locality for species
 †Acrodus cuneocostatus – type locality for species
 †Acrodus oreodontus – type locality for species
 †Acrodus spitzbergensis
 †Acrodus vermicularis – or unidentified comparable form
 †Acuminatella
  †Adocus – or unidentified comparable form
 †Alanites
 †Alanites costatus – type locality for species
 †Alanites mulleri – type locality for species
 †Alanites obesus – type locality for species
 †Alsatites
 †Anaflemingites
 †Anagymnites
 †Anagymnotoceras
 †Anasibirites
 †Anasibirites kingianus
 †Anatropites
 †Angulaticeras
 †Anolcites
 †Aplococeras
  †Arcestes
 †Arctoceras
 †Arctohungarites
 †Arctoprionites
 †Arenicolites
 †Aspenites
 Astarte
 Asteriacites
 Atrina
  †Augustasaurus – type locality for genus
 †Augustasaurus hagdorni – type locality for species
 †Avicularia
 †Balatonites
  †Birgeria
 †Calliconites
 Cardinia
 †Caucasorhynchia
 †Ceccaceras
 †Ceccaisculitoides
 †Ceccaisculitoides elegans – type locality for species
 †Ceratites
  †Ceratodus
 Chlamys
 †Chonespondylus
 †Claraia
 †Claraia aurita
 †Claraia clarai
 †Claraia stachei
  †Colobodus
 †Coral
 Corbula – report made of unidentified related form or using admittedly obsolete nomenclature
 †Coroniceras
  †Cymbospondylus
 †Cymbospondylus petrinus
 †Cymbospondylus piscosus
  †Daonella
 †Daonella americana – type locality for species
 †Daonella dubia
 †Daonella elongata – or unidentified comparable form
 †Daonella gabbi
 †Daonella indica – or unidentified related form
 †Daonella lindstroemi
 †Daonella lommeli – or unidentified comparable form
 †Daonella lommelli – or unidentified comparable form
 †Daonella moussoni
 †Daonella rieberi – type locality for species
 †Daonella sturi – or unidentified comparable form
 †Daxatina
 †Decapod
 †Ellisonia – type locality for genus
  †Encrinus
 †Epigondolella
 †Epigondolella mosheri
 †Eremites
 †Frankites
 †Frechites
 †Germanonautilus
 †Gervillaria
  †Gervillia
 †Gondolella
 †Gondolella carinita – type locality for species
 †Gondolella denuda – or unidentified related form
 †Gondolella eotriassica – type locality for species
 †Gondolella milleri – type locality for species
 †Gondolella nevadensis – type locality for species
 †Gondolella planata – type locality for species
  †Goniatites – report made of unidentified related form or using admittedly obsolete nomenclature
 †Gryphaea
 †Grypoceras
  †Gymnites
 †Gymnites billingsi – type locality for species
 †Gymnites calli – type locality for species
 †Gymnites humboldti – or unidentified comparable form
 †Gymnites perplanus – type locality for species
 †Gymnites tozeri – type locality for species
 †Gymnites tregorum – type locality for species
 †Gyrolepis – tentative report
 †Hybodus
 †Ichthyosaurus
 †Inyoites
 †Inyoites oweni
 †Kraussodontus
 †Lecanites
 †Leiophyllites
  †Leptolepis
 Limaria
 Lopha
  †Macroelongatoolithus
 †Meekoceras
 †Meekoceras gracilitatis
 †Metapolygnathus
 †Metophioceras
 †Michelinoceras
 †Misikella
  †Mixosaurus
 †Modiolus
 †Monophyllites
 †Myophoria
 †Mytilus
 †Naomichelys
 †Neogondolella
  †Neomegalodon
 †Neophyllites – or unidentified comparable form
 †Nerinea
  †Omphalosaurus – type locality for genus
 †Omphalosaurus nevadanus – type locality for species
 †Ophiceras
 †Orthoceras
 Ostrea
 †Oulodus
 †Owenites
 †Owenites koeneni
 †Oxytoma
 †Ozarkodina
 †Palaeospinax – tentative report
 †Paralepidotus – tentative report
 †Paranautilus
  †Phalarodon
 †Phalarodon fraasi
 Pholadomya
 Pinna
 †Plagiostoma
 †Planolites
  †Pleuronautilus
 Plicatula
 †Posidonia
 †Proclydonautilus
 †Protrachyceras
 †Psiloceras
 †Ptychites
 †Ptycholepis – tentative report
  †Rhacophyllites
 †Rhaetina
 †Rhynchonella – report made of unidentified related form or using admittedly obsolete nomenclature
 †Saurichthys
 †Schlotheimia
 †Shonisaurus
  †Shonisaurus popularis
 †Sibyllonautilus
 †Sirenites
 †Solenopora
 †Spiriferina
 †Spiriferina alia
 †Spiriferina homfrayi – type locality for species
 †Spiriferina roundyi
 †Stenopopanoceras
 †Sturia
 †Styrionautilus
  †Thalattoarchon – type locality for genus
 †Thalattoarchon saurophagis – type locality for species
 †Thamnasteria
 †Trichites
 †Trigonia
 †Tutcheria
 †Ussurites
 †Vermiceras
 †Vex
 †Wyomingites
 †Xenoceltites
  †Xenodiscus

Cenozoic

Selected Cenozoic taxa of Nevada

 Abies
 Acer
 †Aelurodon
  †Aepycamelus
 †Aepycamelus bradyi – type locality for species
 †Aepycamelus robustus – or unidentified comparable form
 †Aepycamelus stocki
 †Aesculus
 †Agriotherium
 †Agulla
 †Agulla mineralensis – type locality for species
 †Aletomeryx
 †Alforjas
 Alnus
 Amelanchier
 †Amorpha
 †Anchitheriomys
 Antrozous
 †Antrozous pallidus
  †Aphelops
 †Apis
 †Apis nearctica – type locality for species
 Arbutus
 †Arbutus menziesii
 †Arctodus
 †Arctodus simus
 †Arctostaphylos
 †Astrohippus
  †Barbourofelis
 †Barbourofelis fricki
 Bassariscus
 Betula
 †Borophagus
 †Borophagus diversidens – or unidentified comparable form
  †Brachycrus
 Brachylagus
 †Brachylagus idahoensis
 †Brachypsalis
 †Bumelia
 †Calocedrus
 †Camelops – tentative report
 Candona
 Canis
 †Canis latrans
 †Canis lepophagus
 †Carpocyon
 Carya
 †Carya ovata
 Castanopsis
 Ceanothus
 Cedrela
  †Ceratophyllum
 Cercis
 †Cercocarpus
 †Chamaebatia
 †Chamaecyparis
 Chara
 †Chrysolepis
 Cnemidophorus
 †Cnemidophorus tigris
 Comptonia
 Cornus
  †Cosoryx
 †Cosoryx furcatus
 Crataegus
 Crotalus
 †Crotalus atrox
 †Crotalus viridis
 Crotaphytus
 †Crotaphytus collaris
  †Cuvieronius – tentative report
 †Desmatippus
 †Diceratherium – or unidentified comparable form
 †Dinohippus
 †Diospyros
 Dipodomys
 †Dipoides
 †Diprionomys
  †Dromomeryx
 †Dromomeryx borealis
 †Epicyon
 †Equisetum
 Equus
 †Equus giganteus
 †Equus idahoensis
  †Equus simplicidens
 †Eucastor
 †Euceratherium
 †Euceratherium collinum
 †Eucyon
 †Eucyon davisi
 Eugenia
 †Fraxinus
 Gambelia
 †Garrya
 †Gigantocamelus
 Glyptostrobus
  †Gomphotherium
 Gopherus
 †Gopherus agassizii
 †Gymnocladus
 †Helaletes
 Heloderma
  †Heloderma suspectum
 †Hemiauchenia
 †Hemiauchenia macrocephala – or unidentified comparable form
 †Hesperocamelus
 †Heteromeles
  †Hipparion
 †Hippotherium
 †Holodiscus
 Hydrangea
 †Hyopsodus
  †Hypohippus
 †Hypolagus
 †Hyrachyus
 †Ilingoceros
 †Ilingoceros alexandrae – type locality for species
  †Indarctos
 †Ischyrocyon
 Juglans
 Juniperus
 Lampropeltis
 †Lampropeltis getulus
 Larix
 Lemmiscus
 †Lemmiscus curtatus
 †Leptocyon
 †Leucothoe
 †Lithocarpus
 Lymnaea
 †Lyonothamnus
  †Machairodus
 Mahonia
 †Mammut
  †Mammut americanum
 †Mammut matthewi
 Marmota
 Masticophis
 †Masticophis flagellum
  †Mastodon
 †Megahippus
 †Megalonyx
  †Megalonyx leptostomus
 †Megatylopus
 †Merychippus
 †Merychyus
 †Merycodus
 †Metalopex
 †Metatomarctus
 †Microtomarctus
 Microtus
 †Microtus pennsylvanicus
 †Miopelodytes – type locality for genus
 †Monosaulax
  †Moropus
 Mustela
 †Mustela nigripes
 †Mustela nivalis
 Myotis
 †Neohipparion
 Neotoma
 †Notharctus
  †Notharctus tenebrosus
 Notiosorex
 Odocoileus
 Ondatra
 Oreamnos
 †Oreamnos americanus
 Ostrya
 Ovis
  †Ovis canadensis
 †Pachystima
 †Paracamelus
 †Paracynarctus
  †Parahippus
 †Paratomarctus
 †Paronychomys
 †Peraceras
 Perognathus
 Peromyscus
 Phenacomys
 Phrynosoma
 †Phrynosoma platyrhinos
 Picea
 Pinus
 Pituophis
 †Pituophis catenifer
 Platanus
  †Platygonus
 †Pleiolama
 †Pliauchenia
 †Pliohippus
 Populus
 †Procamelus
 †Protolabis
 †Protomarctus
 Prunus
  †Pseudaelurus
 †Pseudotsuga
 Pteridium
 Pterocarya
 Quercus
 †Rana
 †Rana pipiens
 †Repomys
 †Rhamnus
 Rhododendron
  †Rhynchotherium
 †Ribes
 †Robinia
 Rosa
 Salix
 †Satherium
 †Satherium piscinarium
 Sauromalus
 †Sauromalus obesus
 Scapanus
 Sciurus
 †Sequoiadendron
 †Sequoiadendron chaneyi – type locality for species
  †Sinopa
 †Sophora
 †Sorbus
 Sorex
 †Sparganium
 Spea
 Spermophilus
 Sphaerium
 †Steneofiber
 †Styrax
  †Subdromomeryx
 †Subdromomeryx antilopinus – or unidentified related form
 †Symphoricarpos
 Tamias
 Taxidea
 Taxodium
  †Teleoceras
 †Teleoceras major
 Thomomys
 †Thuja
 †Ticholeptus
 Tipula
  †Tomarctus
 †Tomarctus brevirostris
 †Torreya
 †Tsuga
 Typha
 Ulmus
 †Ursavus
 Ursus
 †Ursus americanus
 †Ursus arctos – or unidentified comparable form
 †Vaccinium
 †Viverravus
 Vulpes
 Zelkova
  †Zygolophodon

References
 

Nevada